Stadion Polonii may refer to:
 Stadion Polonii Bydgoszcz, a multi-purpose stadium in Bydgoszcz, Poland
 Stadion Polonii Warszawa, a multi-purpose stadium in Warsaw, Poland